Estrellas is the seventh studio album by the Gipsy Kings released in 1995 in Europe and a year later in the United States, under the title Tierra Gitana.

Overview
The present album was later released as Tierra Gitana for the American audience, albeit with a different song order. The only differences are the replacement of the song "Los Peces en el Rio" for the instrumental song "Forever"; the song "Mujer" is also slightly different. Also, "A Tu Vera" is a different version than the one that appeared on The Best of the Gipsy Kings.

Track listing

Credits
Acoustic Guitar – Georges Reyes
Drums, Percussion – Negrito Trasante-Crocco
Guitar – Canut Reyes, Maurice "Diego" Baliardo, Paco Baliardo, Patchai Reyes, Paul Reyes, Tonino Baliardo
Keyboards – Dominique Droin
Producer – Claude Martinez
Producer, Bass – Gérard Prévost
Vocals – Nicolas Reyes

References

External links
Estrellas at gipsykings.net
Tierra Gitana at gipsykings.net

1995 albums
Gipsy Kings albums
Nonesuch Records albums